William Moore Benidickson,  (April 8, 1911 – April 1, 1985) was a Canadian politician. He was the Liberal-Labour Member of Parliament for Kenora—Rainy River for over twenty years.

Born in Manitoba of Icelandic stock, Benidickson served in World War II as a Wing-Commander in the Royal Canadian Air Force.

Following the war, he was elected to the House of Commons of Canada in the 1945 federal election.

Due to the politics of Kenora—Rainy River which had a history electing Independent Labour politicians and where the Co-operative Commonwealth Federation posed a serious threat, the Liberals worked with the Communist Party of Canada to run Liberal-Labour candidates in federal and provincial elections. Accordingly, Benidickson ran and was elected as a "Liberal-Labour" MP for most of his parliamentary career though he always sat with the Liberal caucus and was considered a Liberal for all intents and purposes.

Benidickson served as parliamentary assistant to the minister of finance Douglas Abbott before serving in the same capacity to the minister of transport through the 1950s.

In 1963, Benidickson joined the cabinet of Lester Pearson as Minister of Mines and Technical Surveys. Pearson appointed him to the Senate of Canada in 1965 where he sat as a straight Liberal until his death in 1985.

Benidickson's wife, Agnes was a member of Winnipeg's prominent Richardson family and later served as chancellor of Queen's University.

References

External links

Some Honourable Members biographical sketches of several MPs, including Benedickson.

1911 births
1985 deaths
Lawyers in Ontario
Canadian military personnel of World War II
Canadian senators from Ontario
Liberal-Labour (Canada) MPs
Liberal Party of Canada MPs
Liberal Party of Canada senators
Members of the House of Commons of Canada from Ontario
Members of the King's Privy Council for Canada
People from Kenora District
Richardson family